Baek Hee-na (Korean: 백희나, Romanized: Baek Hui-na, born 1 December 1971 in Seoul) is a South Korean author of picture books, an illustrator and animator. She writes picture books with characters that have distinct personalities and with charming storytelling based on various illustration production experiences. Her representative work, Magic Candies, was selected as a recommended work and included on the IBBY Honour List in 2018 and produced as a musical in South Korea. Baek is the first South Korean to win the Astrid Lindgren Memorial Award (ALMA) in 2020. Her picture books have been translated and published in several languages, including English, German, Chinese, Japanese, Swedish and Norwegian.

Life 
Baek was born in Seoul in 1971, majored in Education Technology at Ewha Womans University and studied character animation at the California Institute of the Arts. After graduation, she worked as an animator in the U.S. and returned to South Korea to make her debut with her first picture book, Cloud Bread, in 2004. Film-related classes and studies of directing and storytelling became the basis of her work for picture books. Using her various animation production experiences, she writes picture books with characters that have distinct personalities and charming storytelling. She creates artwork, such as characters and backgrounds, with a lot of creativity, items, and details by participating in exhibitions and filming her work by herself. This allows the maintenance of the intimacy between the background and characters of picture books and the much more vivid conveyance of stories. She lives in Seoul with her husband, two children, and a dog.

Career 
Baek was selected as the Author of the Year for Fiction for her picture book Cloud Bread at the Bologna Children's Book Fair in 2005. Also, her book was selected and introduced in 100 Korean Picture Books at the Frankfurt Book Fair. Cloud Bread has been translated and published in about 10 countries. It was published in English in 2011 and produced as children's musical and TV animation as well. In 2012 and 2013, with the picture book The Bath Fairy, she won a prize at the 53rd Korea Publishing Culture Awards and Changwon Children's Literature Award. Magic Candies was included on the IBBY Honour List in 2018 and won the Picture Book Translation Award and Reader Award in the 24th Japanese Picture Book Awards, sponsored jointly by the Japan School Library Association and Mainichi Daily News in 2019. In 2020, she won the Astrid Lindgren Memorial Award (ALMA).

Despite selling over 500,000 copies of her book and associated merchandise drawing over ₩440 billion (USD $433 million as of 2014) in sales, Baek Hee-Na received only ₩18.5 million (about $18,200 in 2014) in royalties for creating the concept behind Cloud Bread and writing the story  because of an unfair contract of the type common in Korea at the time. The issue led the Korean government to take action against publishing houses that issued these contracts.

Style 
Baek always tries something new in pictures or techniques. She produces and composes works of art and produces books through exhibitions and films, using a 3D illustration technique. Especially, she creates characters using ‘Sculpey.’ Several main characters are produced according to their major facial expressions. She utilizes the stop-motion animation technique. She produces the sets for stories herself and checks the lighting herself for photography to build up her unique world of artwork. The ALMA Steering Committee summarizes her artwork through the following commentary.

"Baek Hee-na is an artist who develops the field of picture books, showing uncompromising and bold techniques and artistic solutions by interestingly combining crafts made by hand and animation elements.”

Awards 
 2005 The Illustrator of the Year Award at the Bologna Children's Book Fair - Cloud Bread
 2012 The 53rd Korea Publishing Culture Awards - The Bath Fairy
 2013 The 3rd Changwon Children's Literature Award - The Bath Fairy 
 2019 The Picture Book Translation Award and Reader Award in the 24th Japanese Picture Book Awards - Magic Candies
 2020 The Astrid Lindgren Memorial Award (ALMA)

Works 
In an interview, she said that she thought that picture books should give readers comfort and courage rather than general teaching. This is well reflected in her works.
 2004 Cloud Bread (Hansol Soobook) 
 2007 The Boy Who Looked for the North Wind (Sigong Junior) 
 2007 The Pink Rope (Sigong Junior) ) 
 2010 Moon Sherbet (Bear Books)   
 2011 Last Evening (Bear Books) 
 2011 Peep's Mother (Bear Books) 
 2012 The Bath Fairy (Bear Books) 
 2014 The Poop Fly I Tasted in my Dream (Bear Books) 
 2016 Strange Mother (Bear Books) 
 2017 Magic Candies (Bear Books) 
 2018 The Strange Visitor (Bear Books) 
 2019 I am a Dog (Bear Books)

Collaborations with other authors 
 2006 I Really like Rainy Days, written by Eun-gyu Choi (Upright Tree)
 2006 Let's Play with the Moon, written by Myo-gwang Park (Upright Tree)
 2006 Our Play and Our Culture in All Seasons, written by Sun-young Lee (Hansol Soobook) * Dak paper doll making 
 2006 Red Bean Porridge Granny and the Tiger, written by Yun-gyu Park (Sigong Junior)

References

External links 
Official Homepage
Personal Social Media Account
The announcement of winners in the 2020 Astrid Lindgren Memorial Award (ALMA)
An interview with winners in the 2020 ALMA
"A Door that opens to Wonderland," Knowledge Channel ⓔ, EBS (Korea Educational Broadcasting System), 2 July 2020
“You Quiz on the Block”  Interview, tvN(South Korean TV Channel of Semi-Comprehensive Programming), 9 September 2020
"Picture Books on a Roll," Docu On, KBS (Korea Broadcasting System), 30 October 2020 (3'29''~ 41'34'')

1971 births
Living people
People from Seoul
South Korean illustrators
South Korean women illustrators
South Korean children's writers
South Korean women children's writers
South Korean children's book illustrators
Astrid Lindgren Memorial Award winners
21st-century South Korean women writers